The Sheldrake River is a freshwater stream located in Southern Westchester County, New York. Approximately  of the Sheldrake River flow through Scarsdale,  through New Rochelle and  through the Town of Mamaroneck.

The Sheldrake River is the largest tributary of the Mamaroneck River, which flows into Long Island Sound. The Sheldrake River drainage system encompasses part of Mamaroneck Town, New Rochelle, Scarsdale, and a minor portion of White Plains.

Geography
From its origin, the river flows south through a medium-density upscale residential neighborhood. The river then enters a culvert running partly under Fenway Golf Course, where it re-surfaces and drains into Fenway Pond. From the pond, the river flows south/southwest past the Heathcote Five Corners intersection from Scarsdale to New Rochelle, eventually ending up in Carpenter Pond. The river flows over the dam at Carpenter Pond, where it widens to an average width of 15 feet and then flows south under the Hutchinson River Parkway and along Pine Brook Boulevard for approximately  where it enters Sheldrake Lake. The river is fed from the reservoir over a spillway into the adjacent Goodliffe Pond.

A dam and spillway at the south end of Goodliffe Pond drains into a  channel that flows east through the Bonnie-Briar Golf Course. From Goodliffe Pond, the Sheldrake River flows through Mamaroneck Town nearly parallel to Weaver Street and south to Valley Stream Road. At this point, the Sheldrake River is joined by the east branch. Downstream from Gardens Lake, the river turns northeast through an industrial section of Mamaroneck Village and carried in culverts underneath the Interstate 95, joining the Mamaroneck River just south of the interstate at Columbus Park in Mamaroneck Village business district.

The East Branch of the Sheldrake River originates in Scarsdale and flows south through the Bonnie-Briar Country Club to meet the east tributary at Fenimore Road. Below Fenimore Road, the east branch flows through Rockland Avenue to meet the Sheldrake River below Valley Stream Road.

The Sheldrake River and east branch have been classified by the New York State Department of Environmental Conservation as Class C. According to this state water quality classification, Class C watercourses should be suitable for fishing and fish propagation and discharges to these watercourses must meet standards that enable those uses. Class C watercourses also are suitable for primary and secondary contact recreation even though other factors may limit the use for that purpose. Water quality standards for Class C watercourses include limitations on fecal coliform, pH, total dissolved solids, and dissolved oxygen.

Tributaries
Two principal tributaries enter the Mamaroneck River, one from the east and one from the west. The East Branch of the Mamaroneck River is the furthest upstream tributary along the Mamaroneck River and originates in north Harrison near the intersection of Westchester Avenue and Anderson Hill Road. The West Branch originates just south of the Hutchinson River Parkway near Mamaroneck Avenue.

East Branch
The East Branch of the Mamaroneck River is 3.3 miles long. The main stem is 1.9 miles long north of its junction with the east branch. The east branch originates from a small pond in north Harrison at about 400 feet above sea level and then flows southeast 0.7 miles into Forest Lake. South of Forest Lake, it flows westerly to its confluence with the main stem. Spring Lake, also known as Croker Pond, is approximately 900 feet above the confluence of the east branch and main stem.

West Branch
The West Branch of the Mamaroneck River is the smallest of the river's two primary tributaries, draining an area of 2.3 square miles just south and southeast of downtown White Plains. The west branch originates from a wetland and pond and flows about 2.75 miles south / southwest through several storm water management basins to its confluence with the main stem near the intersection of Mamaroneck Avenue and Hutchinson River Parkway.

References

See also
List of New York rivers

Long Island Sound
Rivers of New York (state)
Rivers of Westchester County, New York
Geography of New Rochelle, New York